Semitwe is a village in Central District of Botswana. The population was 537 in the 2001 census.

References

Populated places in Central District (Botswana)
Villages in Botswana